

Overview 

Richard Malone is an Irish fashion designer who lives between Wexford, Ireland and London.

Career 

Malone graduated from Central Saint Martins in 2014, resulting in his graduate collection being bought by Brown Thomas Dublin.

In 2017, Malone's work was included in the Museum of Modern Art's Is Fashion Modern? exhibition and is now part of the museum's permanent collection.

Malone presents his work on schedule at London Fashion Week and is part of the British Fashion Council's NEWGEN scheme He is a member of the British Fashion Council.

In 2019, Malone was a finalist in the LVMH Prize and won the Woolmark Prize in 2017.

In February 2021, it was announced that Malone had been selected as a finalist in the BFC/Vogue Designer Fashion Fund 2021.

References

External links
 

Irish fashion designers

Year of birth missing (living people)
Living people